Godwin Komone better known by his stage name Gordons is a Nigerian comedian, musician and actor. He is also the host of the comedy series Comedy Clinic

Early life 
Gordons is a native of Warri in Delta State in Nigeria and spent most of his formative years there. According to him, his parents separated when he was 3 months old and was raised by his grandmother. Both his parents after separation later went on to remarry.

Education and career 
Gordons is a graduate of Delta State University where he studied Integrated science. He started out his music in the choir at World of Life Bible Church and later was part of the music group DC Envoys before his foray into comedy which he started in 2005 when he moved to Lagos from Warri.

Debt controversy 
In 2016, Gordons was accused by the Chairman of The Bank club, Abuja, Kehinde Adegbite who is also known as Mallam Yankee that he was being owed 400,000 naira. However, Gordons later clarified that the issue has been resolved between both parties.

Personal life 
Comedian Gordons is currently married and has five children with his wife who he dated while they were both at Delta State University.

References

Nigerian comedians
Year of birth missing (living people)
Living people